Salvia schizochila is a perennial plant that is native to the Yunnan province in China, found growing in forests at  elevation.

Notes

schizochila
Flora of China